U.S. 69th Infantry Regiment may refer to:

 69th New York Infantry Regiment, 1849-present, the "Fighting 69th"
 69th Infantry Regiment (United States), 1918-19 and 1933-44